|}

The Queen Charlotte Fillies' Stakes is a Listed flat horse race in Great Britain open to fillies and mares aged four years or older. It is run over a distance of 7 furlongs at Chelmsford City in June.

The race was created as a new Listed race in 2018. and is the highest-graded race belonging to Chelmsford City. The title commemorates the Queen Charlotte Stakes, a race run at Chelmsford Racecourse in the 18th and 19th centuries. The new race required royal approval for the title, which carries the name of Queen Charlotte, the consort of George III.

Winners

See also
 Horse racing in Great Britain
 List of British flat horse races

References

Racing Post:

Flat races in Great Britain
Chelmsford City Racecourse
Mile category horse races for fillies and mares
Recurring sporting events established in 2018
2018 establishments in England